John Croke (1508 or 1509 – between 1549 and 1551), was an English politician.

He was a Member (MP) of the Parliament of England for Hindon in 1547.

References

1509 births
16th-century deaths
English MPs 1547–1552